Ahmed Al-Asker (Arabic:أحمد العسكر) (born 1 June 1994) is a Qatari footballer. He currently plays for Al-Waab.

References

External links
 

1994 births
Living people
Qatari footballers
Al-Sailiya SC players
Al-Gharafa SC players
Al-Markhiya SC players
Al-Khor SC players
Mesaimeer SC players
Al-Waab SC players
Qatar Stars League players
Qatari Second Division players
Place of birth missing (living people)
Association football wingers